Samsan Gymnasium Station is a railway station on Seoul Subway Line 7.

Station layout

Vicinity
Exit 1: Sinmyeong Skyview Apt.
Exit 2: Bugae Park
Exit 3: Samsan World Gymnasium
Exit 4: Samsan World Gymnasium
Exit 5: Aiinsworld, Bucheon

Railway stations opened in 2012
Seoul Metropolitan Subway stations
Metro stations in Incheon
Bupyeong District
Metro stations in Bucheon